Events from the year 2022 in Saint Kitts and Nevis

Incumbents 

 Monarch: Elizabeth II (until September 8); then Charles III 
 Governor-General: Tapley Seaton
 Prime Minister: Timothy Harris (until August 6); Terrance Drew onwards
 Speaker: Anthony Michael Perkins

Events 
Ongoing: COVID-19 pandemic in Saint Kitts and Nevis

 1 January – 2022 New Year Honours
 5 August – 2022 Saint Kitts and Nevis general election: The opposition Saint Kitts and Nevis Labour Party, led by Terrance Drew, wins the snap general election to the National Assembly. Drew becomes the prime minister-elect.
 6 August – Terrance Drew is sworn in as prime minister of Saint Kitts and Nevis.
 8 September – Accession of Charles III as King of Saint Kitts and Nevis following the death of Queen Elizabeth II.
 19 September – Minister of Foreign Affairs and former Prime Minister Denzil Douglas attends the state funeral of Queen Elizabeth II in the United Kingdom.

Deaths 

 September 8 – Elizabeth II, Queen of Saint Kitts and Nevis (born 1926)

References 

 
Years of the 21st century in Saint Kitts and Nevis
Saint Kitts and Nevis
Saint Kitts and Nevis
2020s in Saint Kitts and Nevis